Clarence William Allcock (born 18 July 1907) was an English footballer who played in the Football League as a defender for Bradford Park Avenue and Barrow. He was born in Codnor.

References

1907 births
1971 deaths
People from Codnor
Footballers from Derbyshire
English footballers
Association football defenders
Grantham Town F.C. players
Barrow A.F.C. players
Bradford (Park Avenue) A.F.C. players
English Football League players